Richard Clitherow (18 January 1902 – 3 June 1947) was a Labour Party politician in the United Kingdom.

Born in Liverpool, Clitherow was educated at the University of Liverpool, qualifying as a doctor and pharmacist.  From 1919 until 1922, he served in the North West Mounted Police in Canada, then returned to the UK and served in the Liverpool City Police Force.  In 1927, he moved to the United States to work as a pharmacist, then did the same job in China, but returned again to Liverpool in 1930.

Clitherow joined the Conservative Party, and won election to Liverpool City Council in 1937.  However, in 1943, he defected to the Labour Party.  He was elected as Member of Parliament (MP) for Liverpool Edge Hill at the 1945 general election, but died in office in 1947, aged 45. He had been "run down and jaded", taking an overdose of seven barbitone tablets, which was described by the pathologist as a "bold dose". A verdict of accidental death was recorded at the inquest. After his death, the by-election for his seat was won by Labour's Arthur Irvine.

References

External links 
 

1902 births
1947 deaths
Accidental deaths in England
Alumni of the University of Liverpool
Barbiturates-related deaths
British expatriates in Canada
British expatriates in China
British expatriates in the United States
20th-century British medical doctors
British pharmacists
British police officers
Conservative Party (UK) councillors
Councillors in Liverpool
Drug-related deaths in England
Labour Party (UK) MPs for English constituencies
Members of the Parliament of the United Kingdom for Liverpool constituencies
Royal Canadian Mounted Police officers
UK MPs 1945–1950